Shitomi (蔀), also called hajitomi (半蔀) are square-lattice shutters or doors found on older-style Japanese buildings. They are characteristic of the Shinden style, and the Heian Period (794-1185). They were used in aristocrats' palaces, and more rarely occur in temple buildings. They were replaced by sliding panels in the Shoin style.

They are usually split and hinged horizontally; when open, the upper shutter was held up at 90 degrees to the wall with hooks, and the lower half could either be lifted out or folded parallel to the upper shutter. This allows the entire wall to be removed, leaving only the pillars. They are occasionally referenced in modern architecture.

Extant examples
Ujigami Shrine
Osaka Temmangu Shrine
Kinkaku-ji
Ninna-ji
Hōryū-ji

Gallery

See also

List of partitions of traditional Japanese architecture

References

Japanese architectural features
Partitions in traditional Japanese architecture